Ernst Ludwig II, Duke of Saxe-Meiningen (Coburg, 8 August 1709 – Meiningen, 24 February 1729), was a duke of Saxe-Meiningen.

He was the third but second surviving son of Ernst Ludwig I, Duke of Saxe-Meiningen and his first wife, Dorothea Marie of Saxe-Gotha.

The death of his older brother Josef Bernhard (22 March 1724) made him the heir to the duchy of Saxe-Meiningen. When his father died seven months later (24 November 1724), Ernst Ludwig - fifteen years old- inherited the duchy along with his younger brother Karl Frederick.

Because the two princes were under age when their father died, their uncles Frederik Wilhelm and Anton Ulrich served as their guardians until 1733.

Ernst Ludwig died after reigning five years, only twenty years old and unmarried. He was succeeded by his younger brother, Karl Frederick.

Ancestry

References 
 Hannelore Schneider: Das Herzogtum Sachsen-Meiningen unter seinen ersten Herzögen. In: Verona Gerasch (Red.): Beiträge zum Kolloquium: 300 Jahre Schloss Elisabethenburg (= Südthüringer Forschungen. Bd. 27). Staatliche Museen, Meiningen 1994, S. 12–19.  
 Ludwig Hertel: Meiningische Geschichte von 1680 bis zur Gegenwart (= Schriften des Vereins für Sachsen-Meiningische Geschichte und Landeskunde. Heft 47,  = Neue Landeskunde des Herzogtums Sachsen-Meiningen. Heft 10). Gadow & Sohn, Hildburghausen 1904, Digitalisat.

1709 births
1729 deaths
House of Saxe-Meiningen
Dukes of Saxe-Meiningen
People from Coburg
Princes of Saxe-Meiningen